Henoticus is a genus of silken fungus beetles in the family Cryptophagidae. There are at least four described species in Henoticus.

Species
These four species belong to the genus Henoticus:
 Henoticus californicus (Mannerheim, 1843)
 Henoticus mycetoecus (Park, 1929)
 Henoticus serratus (Gyllenhal, 1808)
 Henoticus sinensis Bruce, 1943

References

Further reading

External links

 

Cryptophagidae
Articles created by Qbugbot